The 2012 1. divisjon (referred to as Adeccoligaen for sponsorship reasons) was a Norwegian second-tier football season. The season began on 9 April 2012 and ended on 11 November 2012.

Two clubs, Start and Sarpsborg, were relegated from the 2011 Tippeligaen, while Notodden, Tromsdalen, Ull/Kisa, and Bærum were promoted from the 2011 2. divisjon.

Asker, Nybergsund-Trysil, Randaberg and Løv-Ham were relegated to the 2012 2. divisjon

At the end of the season, the two best teams were promoted to the 2013 Tippeligaen, while the four worst placed teams were relegated to the 2013 2. divisjon.

Teams

Managerial changes

League table

Promotion play-offs 
Start and Sarpsborg were directly promoted, and five teams entered a play-off for the last Tippeligaen spot in the 2013 season. These were:
 A) Sandnes Ulf (by virtue of being the 14th placed team in the Tippeligaen)
 B) Sandefjord (by virtue of being the third placed team in the Adeccoligaen)
 C) Mjøndalen (by virtue of being the fourth placed team in the Adeccoligaen)
 D) Bodø/Glimt (by virtue of being the fifth placed team in the Adeccoligaen)
 E) Ullensaker/Kisa (by virtue of being the sixth placed team in the Adeccoligaen)

The four Adeccoligaen teams first played a single game knockout tournament, with the winner (Ull/Kisa) advancing to a two-legged tie against the Tippeligaen team (Sandnes Ulf) for the 16th and final spot in the 2013 season. Sandnes Ulf retained their Tippeligaen spot with an aggregate 7–1 win over Ull/Kisa.

Season statistics

Top scorers

Source: Alt om fotball

See also 
 2012 in Norwegian football
 2012 Tippeligaen
 2012 2. divisjon
 2012 3. divisjon

References

Norwegian First Division seasons
2
Norway
Norway